The Daily Press Inc. is a daily morning newspaper published in Newport News, Virginia, which covers the lower and middle Peninsula of Tidewater Virginia. It was established in 1896 and bought by Tribune Company in 1986. Current owner Tribune Publishing spun off from the company in 2014. In 2016, The Daily Press has a daily average readership of approximately 101,100. It had a Sunday average readership of approximately 169,200.   Using a frequently used industry-standard readership of 2.2 readers per copy, the October 2022 readership is estimated to be 38,000.  It is the sister newspaper to Norfolk's The Virginian-Pilot, which was its southern market rival until Tribune's purchase of that paper in 2018; the papers have both been based out of the Daily Press building since May 2020.

The Daily Press is distributed to the following cities and counties: Gloucester, Hampton, Isle of Wight, James City, Newport News, Poquoson, Smithfield, Williamsburg, and York. Through its website at dailypress.com, The Daily Press also covers stories on the "Southside", which includes Chesapeake, Norfolk, Portsmouth, Suffolk, and Virginia Beach. Monthly, dailypress.com currently receives nearly 7 million page views.

The Daily Press also owns and publishes The Virginia Gazette, a morning newspaper in Williamsburg, Virginia, which publishes on Wednesdays and Saturdays. It covers Williamsburg, James City County, and York County, and has an average readership of 29,324. Annually, vagazette.com currently receives over 5 million page views.

Additionally, The Daily Press also owns and publishes The Tidewater Review, a morning newspaper in West Point, Virginia, which publishes on Wednesdays. It covers King and Queen County, New Kent County, and King William County; and has a Wednesday readership of 3,100. Monthly, tidewaterreview.com currently receives over 57,300 page views.

Beyond print and web, The Daily Press and its sister products also engage people on social media.

The Daily Press employs approximately 180 people. Included in that number are reporters, editors, graphic designers, photojournalists, advertising sales reps, press operators, crews that package and deliver the paper, and employees that maintain electronic systems. The Daily Press has an online publishing team, a marketing department, a finance department, and a human resources team.

History

The Daily Press published its first edition on January 4, 1896, just 12 days before the General Assembly declared Newport News a city on January 16, 1896. Charles E. Thacker owned and edited the paper from a small printing shop in the basement of the First National Bank at 28th Street and Washington Avenue. Thacker promised in his four-page first edition to “espouse the right and oppose the wrong wherever found.” Thacker sold copies of his paper for one cent.

In 1910, Thacker sold his business to bankers Henry and George Schmelz, who formed The Daily Press Inc. In 1913, they bought The Times-Herald, giving them control of both the morning and afternoon newspapers in the area. Between 1913 and 1986, the papers were owned and managed by members of the Van Buren and Bottom families. The papers were relocated to several sites within the business and financial district of downtown Newport News until 1968, when a building was constructed on Warwick Boulevard. A Production Center was added to the building in 1983 and expanded in 2004.  The newspapers are now printed at a facility in Hanover, Virginia. The Times-Herald published its final edition on August 30, 1991, leaving The Daily Press as the only major newspaper of the lower and middle Peninsula. In December 2014, The Daily Press relocated to its current location on Mariners Row in City Center at Oyster Point in Newport News.

In 1986, Tribune Company (now Tribune Publishing) bought The Daily Press and its affiliated operations, which included cable television stations in Newport News and Danville, Virginia. Tribune named Joseph D. Cantrell CEO and Publisher. Cantrell (1986-1994) was followed by Jack W. Davis Jr. (1994–1998), Kathleen Waltz (1998–2000), Rondra Mathews (2000–2006), Digby Solomon (2006–2016), and Marisa Porto (2016–2019). Par Ridder is currently the interim general manager. Marisa Porto was the first to take on the official title of Publisher and Editor-in-Chief after a structural change to Tribune Publishing in early 2016.

Porto became editor of the Daily Press and The Virginian-Pilot following Tribune Publishing's acquisition of the Norfolk-based Pilot in May 2018. She departed in March 2019. Kris Worrell was hired as editor of both publications in the summer of 2019. All of the publications fall under Tribune Publishing's Virginia Media.

Neither newsroom currently has a physical location. The Daily Press newsroom in Newport News' City Center was vacated in September 2020.

Products

The Daily Press – via Daily Press Media Group – offers a numerous variety of traditional and non-traditional print and digital products to businesses and companies looking to expand their reach in the Hampton Roads area. Variously sized print and deliver inserts and sticky ad notes can be targeted down and delivered to specific zip codes. Annual special section publications and events target niche audiences; examples include the MyTime Women’s Show, Prime Time (55+), and Choice Awards (“Best Of”). The TidewaterBiz newsletter targets a professional audience with economic forecasts and business headlines. Products like ad mail, email reach extension, and Weather.com allow advertisers to target particular audiences beyond dailypress.com.

Virginia Press Association Awards

The Daily Press, Virginia Gazette, and Tidewater Review are multi-year recipients of Virginia Press Association (VPA) Awards.

Most recently, Daily Press Media Group received 55 awards during the 2015 awards banquet in April 2016. Among the 20 first place awards were seven for photo, video and multimedia work; and eight for advertising design. Daily Press reporter Ryan Murphy was named the state’s best young journalist, an annual honor given for a body of work by someone under 30 years old. The best-in-show award for daily photography went to Daily Press photographer Jonathan Gruenke. The best-in-show award for advertising design went to Daily Press graphic designer Cathy Wall. Highlighting the 35 Daily Press awards were five first place awards for photography, including two by Rob Ostermaier for sports photography. Of the Virginia Gazette's 17 awards, reporter Kellen Holtzman won three for online video, breaking news writing and feature series or continuing story. Reporter Adrienne Mayfield won all three of the Tidewater Review's awards, including first place in public safety writing.

In 2014, the VPA honored The Daily Press with its prestigious First Amendment Award, which recognizes journalists and news organizations that seek to advance, defend or preserve the First Amendment. The award is given to journalists who challenge closed governments and courtrooms, who successfully seek access to information, and who oppose threats to freedom of the press. The nominating letter submitted by The Daily Press specifically cited work done by reporters Dave Ress, Theresa Clift, Peter Dujardin, Prue Salasky, Robert Brauchle, Travis Fain and Ryan Murphy, as well as opinion editor Brian Colligan and deputy opinion editor C.W. Johnson.

In 2013, The Daily Press won the VPA’s 2012 award for Journalistic Integrity and Community Service for “Selling Smoke,” a continuing investigation of a Hampton police sting operation and its aftermath. Judge Paul Williams, a former editor of The Patriot Ledger in Massachusetts, called the Daily Press series a "tenacious, intrepid and persistent" investigation of "a police sting operation gone awry" and "the city government culture that wanted to keep it in the dark." Daily Press Publisher Digby Solomon said the series of stories was in keeping with the newspaper's mission: "to provide people with the information they need to run their lives."

Also in 2013, Rob Ostermaier won first place for General News Photo and third place for Breaking News Photo. Adrin Snider won second place for Photo-Illustration. Kevin Goyette was awarded second place for Headline Writing and third place for Front Page Design. Tamara Dietrich won first place for Column Writing, and Robert Brauchle placed second in Government Writing. David Teel won third place in Sports Column Writing.

Notable employees and alumni

Tony Snow served as editorial page editor from 1982 to 1984 and went on to become a nationally syndicated columnist and White House press secretary under President George W. Bush from April 2006 until September 2007.

References

External links 
 
 
 

Mass media in Newport News, Virginia
Daily newspapers published in Virginia
Tribune Publishing
Publications established in 1896
1896 establishments in Virginia